The Otter Tail River (Ojibwe: Nigigwaanowe-ziibi) is a  river in the west-central portion of the U.S. state of Minnesota. It then flows through a number of lakes and cities in Minnesota, including Many Point Lake, Chippewa Lake, Height of Land Lake, Frazee, the Pine lakes, Rush Lake, Otter Tail Lake and Ottertail, West Lost Lake, Fergus Falls, and Orwell Lake.

At its mouth, it joins with the Bois de Sioux River to form the Red River between Breckenridge, Minnesota and Wahpeton, North Dakota. The Red River is the Minnesota–North Dakota boundary from this point onward to the Canada–United States border. Waters of the Red River watershed ultimately flow north into Hudson Bay.

Between 1909 and 1925, the privately owned Otter Tail Power Company built five dams on the Otter Tail River. They are Dayton Hollow (1909), Hoot Lake (1914), Pisgah (1918), Central / Wright (built 1871, rebuilt 1922), and Taplin Gorge (1925).

The Otter Tail River is the third longest river totally within the state of Minnesota and the ninth longest river that flows for some portion through the state.

See also
 List of longest streams of Minnesota
 List of rivers of Minnesota

References

Minnesota Shoreland Management Resource Guide

Rivers of Minnesota
Rivers of Clearwater County, Minnesota
Rivers of Becker County, Minnesota
Rivers of Otter Tail County, Minnesota
Tributaries of the Red River of the North